Hayes St Leger, 2nd Viscount Doneraile (9 March 1755 — 8 November 1819) was an Anglo-Irish politician and peer.

Doneraile was the son of St Leger St Leger, 1st Viscount Doneraile, and the great-grandson of Arthur St Leger, 1st Viscount Doneraile. Like his father, he served in the Irish House of Commons as the Member of Parliament for Doneraile, between 1777 and 1787. He inherited his father's title on 15 May 1787 and assumed his seat in the Irish House of Lords. He married Charlotte Bernard, the daughter of James Bernard and Esther Smith, on 3 September 1785, and together they had three children.

References

1755 births
1819 deaths
Viscounts in the Peerage of Ireland
18th-century Anglo-Irish people
19th-century Anglo-Irish people
Irish MPs 1776–1783
Irish MPs 1783–1790
Hayes
Members of the Parliament of Ireland (pre-1801) for County Cork constituencies